Guzmania killipiana is a plant species in the genus Guzmania. This species is native to Bolivia, Peru, and Ecuador.

References

killipiana
Flora of South America
Plants described in 1932